The Crime of Inspector Maigret (other English-language titles are Maigret and the Hundred Gibbets and The Hanged Man of Saint-Pholien) is a novel by the Belgian writer Georges Simenon. The original French-language version Le Pendu de Saint-Pholien appeared in 1931: it is one of the earliest novels by Simenon featuring the detective Jules Maigret.

In the story, Maigret follows to Bremen, Germany, a man who is behaving oddly and then commits suicide; his investigation leads him to a group of men, now having various careers, who knew each other when they were students in Liège, Belgium.

Publication history
The first English translation, by Anthony Abbot, entitled  The Crime of Inspector Maigret, appeared in 1932, published by Covici, Friede in New York. In 1963 a translation by Tony White, Maigret and the Hundred Gibbets, was published by Penguin Books, . A translation by Linda Coverdale, The Hanged Man of Saint-Pholien, appeared in 2014, published by Penguin Classics, .

Summary
While in Brussels on police business, Maigret notices a scruffy man, who counts a large quantity of banknotes and posts them as "Printed Matter" to an address in Paris; intrigued, he follows the man by train via Amsterdam to Bremen in Germany. At the German frontier at Neuschanz, the man goes to a buffet where Maigret switches his cheap suitcase with a substitute. In a hotel room in Bremen, the man kills himself when he finds his suitcase has been switched. The original suitcase contains an old suit made in Liège: it is not the dead man's size, and analysis shows that it was once covered in blood.

At the mortuary Maigret meets Van Damme, a Belgian with an import-export business in Bremen, who seems to be interested in the dead man.

In Paris, Maigret finds that the man's name is Jean Lecocq d'Arneville, and that the address to which d'Arneville posted the banknotes was his own address, a cheap hotel. Maigret goes to Rheims, where d'Arneville's photo, printed in newspapers, has been recognized. He was seen with Émile Belloir, the vice-chairman of a bank. Visiting Belloir, Maigret again meets Van Damme, along with Janin, a sculptor in Paris, and Jef Lombard, who has a photoengraving business in Liège. They were once students together in Liège. They look alarmed when Maigret shows them the photograph.

Maigret goes to Liège and visits Jef Lombard's workshop. Van Damme is there. Maigret's mention of d'Arneville's name has a reaction from both. On the wall of Lombard's office are many sketches showing hanged men, drawn by Lombard, he says, when he was nineteen; some show the church of St Pholien (L'église Saint-Pholien), in the city.

At the police station in Liège, Maigret finds a report for that time: Émile Klein was found hanged on the door of the church of St Pholien. At Klein's address, among squalid buildings near the church, he meets Van Damme, Belloir and Lombard. They had hoped that Maigret would accept payment to drop the case. Belloir tells Maigret that as young men they were members a group, calling themselves "The Companions of the Apocalypse", who met in that room, a studio rented by Klein who was one of the group, to discuss radical intellectual ideas. One day they considered the idea of killing someone, and Klein stabbed another of the group, who died. Klein was later found hanged, and the group stopped meeting.

Since then, d'Arneville, the only member of the group unable to get over the affair, had not had a career, but blackmailed the others with the stabbed man's suit; he did not use the money, but burnt the banknotes.

Maigret, aware that three of the men have children, does not take any action; in a month's time it will be ten years since the crime, and prosecution will not be possible.

Background

The idea of the story relates to a period in Simenon's own past, with many of the characters, setting, and names closely based on the author's own experiences as a young adult in his hometown. He was born and spent his early life in Liège, and was one of a group of young men in the city, calling themselves "La Caque", who had a bohemian lifestyle; they met to read aloud the works of writers which interested them, and they questioned conventional morality. The group was close-- "La Caque" was a reference to a kind of fisherman's barrel used for closely packing and transporting herring—and they adopted the symbol of the hanged man. One member, a painter and friend of Simenon named Joseph Kleine, was found hanging from the door of St Pholien's church: it was apparently suicide, but murder was suspected.

References

1931 Belgian novels
Maigret novels
Novels set in Belgium
Covici-Friede books